Drumchapel Amateur Football Club is a football club from the village of Duntocher, near Clydebank in Scotland. Formed in 1950 in the Drumchapel area of the city of Glasgow, they are nicknamed "The Drum". The club presently competes in the Central Scottish Amateur Football League and is viewed as one of the top amateur clubs in the country, winning the Scottish Amateur Cup as recently as 2005.

A team with a proud history, they have been the start for many players who would turn professional such as George McLean, Jim Forrest, Alex Willoughby, Alex Ferguson, Walter Smith, David Moyes, Andy Gray, Archie Gemmill, John Wark, Kenny McDowall, Asa Hartford, Eddie McCreadie, John Robertson and Paul Wilson.

Club colours were originally green and white hoops; in the late-1980s the club moved on to red and black. The Drum play their home games at Glenhead Park, which is the former home of junior club Duntocher Hibernian. When Duntocher Hibs became defunct Drumchapel moved in, meaning that they no longer play home games in the area that gives them their name. It does mean they have one of the best playing facilities of any amateur team in Scotland. There is also still a youth system in place below the senior team.

A portrait of club founder Douglas Smith hangs in the Scottish Football Museum at Hampden Park, in recognition of his contribution to the club and the development of young footballers. It was unveiled in 2014 by former Drumchapel player Alex Ferguson.

See also
:Category:Drumchapel Amateur F.C. players

References

External links
 Official Website (Archived since 2005)
 

Football clubs in Scotland
Football clubs in Glasgow
Football in West Dunbartonshire
Association football clubs established in 1950
1950 establishments in Scotland
Amateur association football teams
Drumchapel
Amateur association football in Scotland